Guy Hirsch (20 September 1915 – 4 August 1993) was a Belgian mathematician and philosopher of mathematics, who worked on algebraic topology and epistemology of mathematics.

He became a member of the Royal Flemish Academy of Belgium for Science and the Arts in 1973.

He is known for the Leray–Hirsch theorem, a basic result on the algebraic topology of fiber bundles that he proved independently of Jean Leray in the late 1940s.

References

External links
 

1915 births
Mathematicians from London
1993 deaths
Belgian mathematicians
Topologists
Free University of Brussels (1834–1969) alumni
Academic staff of the Free University of Brussels (1834–1969)
British emigrants to Belgium